Acrometopia is a genus of flies in the family Chamaemyiidae.

Species
A. annulitibia Smith, 1966
A. conspicua Papp, 2005
A. setosifrons Cogan, 1978
A. carbonaria (Loew, 1873)
A. cellularis (Blanchard, 1852)
A. reicherti (Enderlein, 1929)
A. wahlbergi (Zetterstedt, 1846)

References

Chamaemyiidae
Lauxanioidea genera
Taxa named by Ignaz Rudolph Schiner